HMS Consort was one of thirty-two  destroyers built for the Royal Navy during the Second World War, a member of the eight-ship Co sub-class.

Design and description
The Co sub-class was a repeat of the preceding Ch sub-class.

The ships were powered by a pair of geared steam turbines, each driving one propeller shaft using steam provided by two Admiralty three-drum boilers. The ships' complement was 186 officers and ratings.

The main armament of the destroyers consisted of four QF  Mk IV dual-purpose guns, one superfiring pair each fore and aft of the superstructure protected by partial gun shields. Their anti-aircraft suite consisted of one twin-gun stabilised Mk IV "Hazemeyer" mount for  Bofors guns and two single 2-pounder (40 mm) AA guns amidships, and single mounts for a  Oerlikon AA gun on the bridge wings. The ships were fitted with one quadruple mount for 21-inch (533 mm) torpedo tubes. The ships were equipped with a pair of depth charge rails and two throwers for 35 depth charges.

Construction and career
Consort was ordered from Alexander Stephens & Sons and the ship was laid down on 26 May 1943 at its shipyard in Linthouse, launched on 19 October 1944 and was commissioned on 19 March 1946.

Consort was damaged by artillery fire during the Yangtze Incident in an attempt to tow the sloop  from a mudbank, taking 56 direct hits, and causing casualties of 23 wounded and a further ten dead.

Following decommissioning she was sold to the Prince of Wales Drydock Co., of Swansea, Wales, for scrap and arrived there on 15 March 1961.

References

Bibliography
 
 
 
 
 
 
 
 

 

Korean War destroyers of the United Kingdom
C-class destroyers (1943) of the Royal Navy
1944 ships
Ships built on the River Clyde
Maritime incidents in 1949